Waples is a surname. Notable people with the surname include:

Douglas Waples (1893—1978), American author
Keith Waples (1923–2021), Canadian Harness race driver
Ron Waples (born 1944), Canadian Harness race driver
Wesley Jonathan Waples (born 1978), American actor
Melchisdec A. Waples Jr. (born 1982), US Army NCO